Meleh-ye Posht-e Sar Takht (also known as Posht Melleh-ye Sar Takht) is a village in Afrineh Rural District, Mamulan District, Pol-e Dokhtar County, Lorestan Province, Iran. At the 2006 census, its population was 33, in 6 families.

References 

Towns and villages in Pol-e Dokhtar County